The 2014 Napa Valley Challenger, also known as the ATP Challenger Napa, was a tennis tournament held in Napa, California. It was first held in 2013, and was played on outdoor hard courts.

In 2014, Donald Young was the defending champion, but chose not to compete.

Sam Querrey won the title by defeating Tim Smyczek 6–3, 6–1 in the final.

Seeds

Draw

Finals

Top half

Bottom half

References
 Main Draw
 Qualifying Draw

Napa Valley Challenger - Singles
2014 Singles